Roberto Roxas (born 15 April 1946) is a former Filipino cyclist. He competed in the sprint event at the 1968 Summer Olympics.

References

External links
 

1946 births
Living people
Filipino male cyclists
Olympic cyclists of the Philippines
Cyclists at the 1968 Summer Olympics
Sportspeople from Rizal